Hellinger is a surname. Notable people with the surname include: 

Bert Hellinger (1925–2019), German psychotherapist
Ernst Hellinger (1883–1950), German mathematician
Hellinger distance, used to quantify the similarity between two probability distributions
Hellinger integral, used to define the Hellinger distance in probability theory
Mark Hellinger (1903–1947), American journalist, theatre columnist and film producer
Mark Hellinger Theatre, former Broadway theatre and cinema complex
Martin Hellinger (1904–1988), German Nazi dentist